State Route 603 (SR 603) is a north–south state highway in the northern portion of the U.S. state of Ohio. Its southern terminus is at State Route 95 near Perrysville, and its northern terminus is at State Routes 61 and 98 in Plymouth along the Baseline Road that separates Huron County and Richland County, and subsequently the southern boundary of the Firelands and Connecticut Western Reserve.

History
SR 603 was commissioned in 1938 along its current alignment, between Shiloh and SR 95. Between 1953 and 1955 the route was paved. The route was extended west to Plymouth between 1959 and 1961.

Major intersections

References

603
Transportation in Richland County, Ohio
Transportation in Ashland County, Ohio